Humphrey of Hauteville (c. 1010 – August 1057), surnamed Abagelard, was the count of Apulia and Calabria from 1051 to his death.

Life
Humphrey was probably the youngest son of Tancred of Hauteville by his first wife Muriel. Some sources make Geoffrey and Serlo his younger brothers. He is usually said to have accompanied his elder brothers William and Drogo to the Mezzogiorno circa 1035 on the basis of Goffredo Malaterra; however, he may have arrived later, in 1044, during the reign of his elder brother William. Around 1047, he was granted the lordship (or countship) of Lavello by his brother Drogo, whom he succeeded as Count of Apulia in August 1051. In his early years in Lavello, he employed a young Richard Drengot, who was later to serve him against the pope. In 1053, Humphrey received his three brothers, Geoffrey and their half-brothers Mauger and a younger William, on their arrival in Italy. He granted Mauger the Capitanate and William the Principate.

His reign began amid the troubles which had ended his brother's. Humphrey vigorously punished the instigators of his brother's assassination, especially the principal murderer. Many Norman knights were in rebellion and pillaging papal lands. Guaimar IV of Salerno supported Humphrey's succession, but he was soon assassinated. Pope Leo IX organised a coalition against the Normans and marched south. The pope's forces and those of the Normans fought the Battle of Civitate near Civitate sul Fortore on 18 June 1053. Humphrey led the armies of the Hautevilles (assisted by his younger half-brother Robert Guiscard) and Drengots (assisted by Richard Drengot) against the combined forces of the Papacy and the Holy Roman Empire. The Normans destroyed the papal army and captured the pope, whom they imprisoned in Benevento, which they had been authorised by the emperor to capture in 1047. They finally released him on 12 March 1054. Leo died soon after. 

In the aftermath of Civitate, the Normans under Humphrey took advantage of the severely weakened papacy to further their conquest. He took Oria, Nardò, and Lecce by the end of 1055. Robert Guiscard, the hero of Civitate, meanwhile conquered Minervino Murge, Otranto, and Gallipoli, Apulia before Humphrey sent him back to Calabria in fear of his growing power and influence. Upon his death in 1057 (or 1056 according to some sources), Humphrey was succeeded as count by Robert. Humphrey had given Guiscard the guardianship of his young sons, but Guiscard confiscated their inheritance. Humphrey is buried in the Abbey of the Santissima Trinità in Venosa.

Relatives
Humphrey's wife was called a "sister of the Duke of Sorrento" by Amatus of Montecassino. This would make her Gaitelgrima, a daughter of Guaimar III of Salerno. It is often stated that his wife was Gaitelgrima, the widow of his brother Drogo, however this is impossible. Humphrey had two children:
Abelard of Hauteville, born after 1044 and died in Greece in 1081. 
Herman, born after 1045 and died in Byzantium in 1097

We know that Humphrey also had at least one daughter because of a story told by Amatus. Abelard was fleeing Robert Guiscard with "Gradilon, the husband of his sister" in 1078 when in revolt against his uncle. Gradilon was captured by the Guiscard's troops near Trevico in the summer of 1079 and blinded.

Notes

Sources
Ghisalberti, Albert (ed). Dizionario Biografico degli Italiani: II Albicante – Ammannati. Rome, 1960.
Gwatkin, H. M., Whitney, J. P. (ed) et al. The Cambridge Medieval History: Volume III. Cambridge University Press, 1926.
Norwich, John Julius. The Normans in the South 1016–1130. Longmans, London, 1967.
Chalandon, Ferdinand. Histoire de la domination normande en Italie et en Sicilie. Paris, 1907.
Gravett, Christopher, and Nicolle, David. The Normans: Warrior Knights and their Castles. Osprey Publishing: Oxford, 2006.
Beech, George. A Norman-Italian Adventurer in the East: Richard of Salerno. 1993.

External links
History of the Norman World.
Leeds Medieval History Texts in Translation.

1057 deaths
Italo-Normans
Norman warriors
Counts of Apulia and Calabria
Year of birth uncertain
Humphrey
Burials at the Abbey of Santissima Trinità, Venosa